Keith Nicholson Buttle  (23 November 1900 – 15 December 1973) was a New Zealand businessman and politician. He served as mayor of Auckland City from 1957 to 1959.

Biography
Born 23 November 1900 in Auckland, Buttle attended Auckland Grammar School. On 23 March 1927, he married Una Agnes Parkinson at the Pitt Street Methodist church in Auckland. He was a sharebroker and partner in an Auckland firm of sharebrokers. He served on the Auckland City Council for 18 years, the Auckland Harbour Board for five years and Auckland Harbour Bridge Authority for three years.

Buttle was elected mayor of Auckland City, replacing Thomas Ashby in a by-election in November 1957 after Ashby died part-way through his term. In the 1961 New Year Honours, Buttle was appointed a Commander of the Order of the British Empire, in recognition of his service as Auckland mayor.

Buttle died on 15 December 1973, and he was buried at Purewa Cemetery.

References

1900 births
1973 deaths
Mayors of Auckland
20th-century New Zealand businesspeople
New Zealand Commanders of the Order of the British Empire
People educated at Auckland Grammar School
New Zealand stockbrokers
Auckland City Councillors
20th-century New Zealand politicians
Burials at Purewa Cemetery
Auckland Harbour Board members